Abracadabrella is a genus of spiders in the family Salticidae (jumping spiders) whose spp. appear to mimics flies. The type species for the genus was described by Ludwig Koch (1879) as Marptusa elegans, transferred to Ocrisiona by Eugène Simon (1901) then placed into Abracadabrella by Marek Żabka (1991).

Specimens have been collected on or under Eucalyptus bark, or on vegetation. They are small to medium, flattish jumping spiders with large, bulging, black-shiny 'eyes' on the rear of the abdomen, apparently to mimic flies. It is in the unident group, with one retromarginal tooth on the chelicera, two on the promargin opposite. Leg I is the strongest, while leg IV the longest. These spiders have been observed walking backwards, enhancing the mimicry affect. They are found mostly in Queensland, especially warmer parts, on vegetation and under the bark of gum trees. Specimens have been sighted at Darwin NT, Townsville QLD, Wooloolga, Gosford and Grafton NSW. A western Queensland species from Birdsville and a South Australian species from Lewiston have been documented.

Name
The genus name appears to be a play on the word Abracadabra but is cited by the author as being a random combination of letters, feminine in gender.

Species
 Abracadabrella birdsville Żabka, 1991 – Queensland
 Abracadabrella elegans (L. Koch, 1879) – Queensland
 Abracadabrella lewiston Żabka, 1991 – South Australia

References

Salticidae
Salticidae genera
Spiders of Australia
Taxa named by Ludwig Carl Christian Koch